Eudora may refer to:

Places
 Eudora, Arkansas, a city
 Eudora, Kansas, a city
 Eudora Township, Douglas County, Kansas
 Eudora, Mississippi, an unincorporated community
 Eudora, Missouri, an unincorporated community

Other
 217 Eudora, an asteroid
 Eudora (album), an album by The Get Up Kids
 Eudora (band), a rock band from Orange County California
 Eudora (email client)
 Eudora (mythology), the name of three nymphs in Greek mythology
 Eudora (Peanuts), a minor Peanuts comic strip character
 Eudora Internet Mail Server
 Eudora, a character voiced by Oprah Winfrey in the Disney animated film The Princess and the Frog (2009)

People with the given name
 Eudora Stone Bumstead (1860–1892), American poet, hymnwriter
 Eudora Welty (1909–2001), an American writer

English feminine given names
Given names of Greek language origin